Oglesville is an unincorporated community in southeastern Butler County, in the U.S. state of Missouri.

The community is on Missouri Route N between Carola to the southwest and Qulin to the northeast. The Black River flows  past 1.5 miles to the northwest.

The community was named after Louis Ogle, an early citizen.

References

Unincorporated communities in Butler County, Missouri
Unincorporated communities in Missouri